Six Going On Seven was an indie rock band from Boston, Massachusetts. Members included Josh English (vocals/bass), James Bransford (guitar) and Will Bartlett (drums).

During their career they recorded three full-length albums and a handful of 7" singles. They were included on a number of compilations and had a song in the movie The Station Agent. They toured with Elliott and put out a split EP with Hot Water Music. The band split in 2001 just after the release of their album American't (or won't).

Discography
Self-Made Mess (Some Records, 1997)
Heartbreak's Got Backbeat (Some, 1999)
American't (or Won't) (Big Wheel Recreation, 2001)

References

Musical groups from Boston
Rock music groups from Massachusetts
Doghouse Records artists